The Kowloonbay International Trade & Exhibition Centre (KITEC, formerly known as the Hong Kong International Trade and Exhibition Centre or HITEC), is an exhibition centre, shopping mall and performance venue situated at 1 Trademart Drive, Kowloon Bay, Kowloon, Hong Kong. It was developed by Hopewell Holdings Ltd.

Convention & Exhibition Facilities
Multi-functional venues, including Music Zone @ E-Max, Rotunda 1, Rotunda 2, Rotunda 3 and Star Hall, can accommodate exhibitions, concerts, banquets and business functions. There is an auditorium with 702 tiered seats and a conference centre with 17 meeting rooms on the 6th and 7th floors.

E-Max shopping mall
The mall provides dining in the forms of Chinese and western restaurants and cafés. Major tenants include: 
 Hong Kong Bowling City (Closed)
 Kowloon Bay Integrated Auto Mall
 Premier Home Forum 
 PetMax
 Starbucks
 The Metroplex, self-operated independent cinema with 9 screens and a total capacity of over 1,100 people, G/F. (Opened on 14 February 2014)

Office

It includes several divisions of the Registration and Electoral Office.

Star Hall

Star Hall is the performance venue inside KITEC. It can accommodate audiences of 3,600 people. It is a popular venue for concerts. The 4-storey Star Hall measuring  offers column-free space.

A Symphony of Lights
KITEC joined A Symphony of Lights on 26 June 2007 with its searchlights.

References

External links

 KITEC official website
 E-Max website

Music venues in Hong Kong
Shopping centres in Hong Kong
Convention and exhibition centres in Hong Kong
Hopewell Holdings
Kowloon Bay